In Greek mythology, Cephalus (Ancient Greek: Κέφαλος Kephalos) was a member of the Athenian royal family as the son of Princess Herse and Hermes.

Family 
In some accounts, Cephalus was said to be the son of Hermes by Creusa or of Pandion I.

Mythology 
Because of Cephalus's great beauty, Eos (Dawn) fell in love with him. He was eventually carried off and ravished by her in Syria. Consorting with the goddess, by some accounts Cephalus became the father of Tithonus, the father of Phaethon. Another version of the myth provides that Phaethon was said to be his son instead of Tithonus.

On the pediment of the kingly Stoa in the Kerameikos at Athens, and on the temple of Apollo at Amyclae, the carrying off of Cephalus by Hemera (not Eos) was represented. According to a single myth, Eosphorus was also called the son of Cephalus and Eos.

Notes

References 

 Apollodorus, The Library with an English Translation by Sir James George Frazer, F.B.A., F.R.S. in 2 Volumes, Cambridge, MA, Harvard University Press; London, William Heinemann Ltd. 1921. ISBN 0-674-99135-4. Online version at the Perseus Digital Library. Greek text available from the same website.
Gaius Julius Hyginus, Astronomica from The Myths of Hyginus translated and edited by Mary Grant. University of Kansas Publications in Humanistic Studies. Online version at the Topos Text Project.
 Gaius Julius Hyginus, Fabulae from The Myths of Hyginus translated and edited by Mary Grant. University of Kansas Publications in Humanistic Studies. Online version at the Topos Text Project.
 Hesiod, Theogony from The Homeric Hymns and Homerica with an English Translation by Hugh G. Evelyn-White, Cambridge, MA., Harvard University Press; London, William Heinemann Ltd. 1914. Online version at the Perseus Digital Library. Greek text available from the same website.
 Nonnus of Panopolis, Dionysiaca translated by William Henry Denham Rouse (1863-1950), from the Loeb Classical Library, Cambridge, MA, Harvard University Press, 1940.  Online version at the Topos Text Project.
 Nonnus of Panopolis, Dionysiaca. 3 Vols. W.H.D. Rouse. Cambridge, MA., Harvard University Press; London, William Heinemann, Ltd. 1940–1942. Greek text available at the Perseus Digital Library.
Pausanias, Description of Greece with an English Translation by W.H.S. Jones, Litt.D., and H.A. Ormerod, M.A., in 4 Volumes. Cambridge, MA, Harvard University Press; London, William Heinemann Ltd. 1918. . Online version at the Perseus Digital Library
Pausanias, Graeciae Descriptio. 3 vols. Leipzig, Teubner. 1903.  Greek text available at the Perseus Digital Library.

Princes in Greek mythology
Children of Hermes
Demigods in classical mythology
Attican characters in Greek mythology
Consorts of Eos